Marcello Dudovich (21 March 1878 – 31 March 1962) was an Italian painter,  illustrator, and poster designer.  Together with Leonetto Cappiello, Adolfo Hohenstein, Giovanni Maria Mataloni and Leopoldo Metlicovitz he is considered one of the progenitors of Italian poster design.

Biography
Marcello Dudovich was born in 1878 in Trieste to an Italian mother and a Dalmatian father. His father, Antonio Dudovich, born in Traù (Trogir), Dalmatia, was a fervent Italian irredentist who fought alongside Giuseppe Garibaldi during the Third Italian War of Independence, and worked for the insurance company Assicurazioni Generali. Marcello attended the prestigious Royal School in Trieste. Upon completing his studies, he began working with his father as a lithographer and illustrator for advertising art, prints and posters.

He relocated from Trieste to Milan in 1897 after attending a professional art school. He was recruited as a lithographer by Ricordi, a music publisher, thanks to his father's friendship with the illustrator and cartoonist Leopoldo Metlicovitz, and was given charge over advertisement design.

In 1899 he transferred to Bologna, working here for the publisher Edmondo Chappuis, designing billboards, book covers and illustrations for publications such as Italia Ride in 1900 e Fantasio in 1902.   Here he met Elisa Bucchi, his future wife.

In 1900 he won the "Gold Medal" at the Paris World Fair.

In 1905 Dudovich returned to Milan to rejoin Ricordi.  Here, in the next few years, he designed some of his well-known posters, including a series of famous advertising posters for the department store (E & A Mele) in Naples and "Borsalino". In the 1920s he made several posters for the Milan department store, La Rinascente, and in 1922 he was appointed artistic director of "Igap".

In 1930 he designed a prominent poster for Pirelli. After the Second World War he moved away from the world of commercial art, concentrating instead on his painting.

Marcello Dudovich died in Milan from a cerebral hemorrhage on 31 March 1962.

Dudovich is celebrated as one of Italy's greatest poster artists.   He was inspired by Edward Penfield, by his friend and teacher Adolfo Hohenstein and by Alphonse Mucha.   But ultimately his reputation comes from his having developed his own very distinctive and richly coloured style.

Gallery

References

External links 
Marcello Dudovich

1878 births
1962 deaths
19th-century Italian painters
Italian male painters
20th-century Italian painters
20th-century Italian male artists
Italian poster artists
Art Nouveau painters
Art Nouveau illustrators
Italian illustrators
Artists from Trieste
19th-century Italian male artists
Austro-Hungarian emigrants to Italy